Petr Hronek (born 4 July 1993) is a Czech footballer who plays as a midfielder for Slavia Prague.

Club career

Youth level
On youth level he played for AC Sparta Prague.

FK Jablonec
On 1 January 2013 he moved to FK Jablonec in Czech First League. He made his debut for the first team on 12 August 2013 in first league match against FC Baník Ostrava.

It was the only match he played for FK Jablonec on senior level.

FC Sellier and Bellot Vlašim (loan)
On 21 January 2014 he was loaned to FC Sellier & Bellot Vlašim in Czech National Football League. In one year long loan he played in 29 league matches (scoring 5 goals) and in 1 Czech Cup match without scoring a goal.

1. FK Příbram (loan)
On 1 February 2015 he was loaned to 1. FK Příbram in Czech First League. In five months long loan he played just in 1 league match without scoring a goal.

FC Sellier and Bellot Vlašim
On 2 July 2015 he moved back to FC Sellier & Bellot Vlašim on permanent basis. He played in 15 league matches (scoring 4 goals) and in 2 Czech Cup matches (without scoring a goal).

FC Vysočina Jihlava
On 1 January 2016 he moved to FC Vysočina Jihlava in Czech First League. He played in 42 league matches (scoring 10 goals) and in 4 Czech Cup matches (without scoring a goal).

FC Fastav Zlín
On 31 August 2017 he moved to FC Fastav Zlín in Czech First League. He played in 36 league matches (scoring 3 goals) and in 6 Czech Cup matches (without scoring a goal). He also played in one 2017-18 UEFA Europa League group stage match against FC Lokomotiv Moscow (without scoring a goal).

Bohemians Prague 1905 (loan)
On 1 July 2019 he was loaned to Bohemians 1905 in Czech First League. In one year long loan he played in 22 league matches (scoring 5 goals) and in one Czech Cup match (without scoring a goal). He also played in one match (scoring one goal) for the reserve team in Bohemian Football League.

Bohemians Prague 1905
On 1 July 2020 he moved to Bohemians 1905 on permanent basis. Since then he played in 15 league matches (scoring 3 goals) and in one Czech Cup match without scoring a goal (actual to 21 January 2021).

Slavia Prague
On 9 December 2022 he moved to SK Slavia Prague in Czech First League.

References

External links
 
 https://www.fortunaliga.cz/hrac/2742-petr-hronek

1993 births
Living people
Czech footballers
Association football midfielders
Czech First League players
AC Sparta Prague players
FK Jablonec players
FC Sellier & Bellot Vlašim players
1. FK Příbram players
FC Vysočina Jihlava players
FC Fastav Zlín players
Bohemians 1905 players
SK Slavia Prague players